Abdul Razzaq Kemal (known as A. R. Kemal) (14 April 1946 – 24 March 2008) was a Pakistani economist, considered "an  authority  on  the  Pakistani economy and on economic policy making". He was the director of the Pakistan Institute of Development Economics (1999–2006).

Early life and education
Kemal was born in Amritsar, India, in 1946. His qualifications in economics included a master's degree from Stanford University, USA, and a PhD from the University of Manchester, UK.

Career
Kemal served as the chief economist of the Pakistani government Planning Commission and economic advisor to the Ministry of Finance. He directed the Pakistan Institute of Development Economics from 1999 to 2006. During his directorship, he started MPhil and PhD programmes in economics, and was instrumental in the institute's application for degree-awarding status being approved in 2003, although the degree-awarding charter was not finalised until after his retirement.

He was also a member of the restructuring committee of the Islamic Research and Training Institute and the Islamic Development Bank. He advised organisations including the United Nations Development Programme (UNDP), UNICEF, United Nations Economic and Social Commission for Asia and the Pacific (ESCAP), International Labour Organization (ILO), Asian Development Bank and the World Bank. He served as president of the Pakistan Institute of Development Economics (PIDE).

He taught economics at the International Islamic University in Islamabad. He wrote or edited 12 books and published 186 research articles.

Personal life
He was married with two children, both sons. In 2008, Kemal died in Islamabad at the age of 62, after a heart attack.

Awards and recognition
Sitara-i-Imtiaz (Star of Excellence) Award by the President of Pakistan in 2007

Selected publications
Rashid Amjad, A. R. Kemal (1997). Macroeconomic Policies and their Impact on Poverty Alleviation in Pakistan. The Pakistan Development Review 36: 39–68

References

1946 births
2008 deaths
Scholars from Amritsar
Alumni of the University of Manchester
Stanford University alumni
Pakistani economists
Recipients of Sitara-i-Imtiaz